Kantharajapura is a village in Hassan district of Karnataka state, India.

Location
Kantharajapura is located 2.9 km southwest of Shravanabelagola temple town.

Tourist attractions
Lakshmi Narayana Devara Temple is located at Kantharajapura.

Demographics
There are 1,175 people in the village, according to the latest census.  They live in 300 houses. The total area of the village is 283 hectares.  There is a post office in the village and the PIN code is 573124.

Education
 Bahubali Engineering  college
 Bahubali Nursing college 
 Bahubali Polytechnic

See also
 B.Cholenahalli
 Channarayapatna
 Shravanabelagola
 Shravaneri

References

Villages in Hassan district